Sidney R. Grande (May 31, 1927 – February 1, 2016) an American football coach. He was the head football at Jamestown College—now known as the University of Jamestown—in Jamestown, North Dakota, serving for seven seasons, from 1957 to 1963, and compiling a record of 23–31–1.

Head coaching record

References

1927 births
2016 deaths
Jamestown Jimmies football coaches
People from Jamestown, North Dakota